University of the Philippines Arboretum, also known as UP Arboretum, is a botanical garden located on the campus of the University of the Philippines Diliman in Quezon City, Philippines. It lies at the northern part of the village of U.P. Campus between the U.P.-Ayala Land TechnoHub on Commonwealth Avenue to the south and Central Avenue and the village of Culiat to the north, close to the Philippine Nuclear Research Institute. The  man-made forest garden houses a collection of more than 9,000 tropical plants of about 77 unique species. It is one of few rainforests of its size located entirely within Metro Manila.

History
The arboretum was originally part of a large estate owned by the Jesuits during the Spanish colonial period. The Tuason family acquired the property in the 19th century including the open lands of the Santa Mesa and Mariquina estates. By 1938, the Philippine Commonwealth government purchased the land from the Tuasons after it has been selected as the site of the new capital. Of the total  purchased by the government,  was set aside for the campus extension of the  University of the Philippines in Manila. The site of the arboretum was initially converted to a forest nursery by the Department of Agriculture and Natural Resources. During World War II, this "wooded area" housed the "American employees' quarters" of the United States Army. When the Philippines gained independence in 1948, the nursery was turned over to the university by the U.S. government and the arboretum was established. The administration of the arboretum was officially transferred to the University of the Philippines Diliman from the Reforestation Administration of the Department of Agriculture in 1962.

Description
It lies in the middle of a natural ridge that runs northwest-southeast and is crossed by small creeks. The arboretum contains a collection of tropical plant species, many of which are endemic and endangered. The most common trees found in the arboretum are kupang, mahogany, narra, and rain trees. Many of these trees tower as high as 20 feet or more. It is also inhabited by alibangbáng, palo santo, monkey pod and tagutagu. They provide a sanctuary to 47 bird species, such as the long-tailed shrike, olive-backed sunbird, Philippine pygmy woodpecker, brown shrike, yellow-vented bulbul, lowland white-eye, pied triller, Eurasian tree sparrow, mountain shrike, Pacific swallow, pied fantail, tailorbird, lemon-throated leaf warbler and the spotted dove.

The arboretum is also a habitat to 15 species of reptiles and amphibians, which include Tokay gecko, house gecko, Stejneger's hemidactylid gecko, Mabuya mutifascia, cane toad, common green frog, giant Visayan frog, Chinese edible frog, common tree frog and common puddle frog. In addition, the arboretum is home to several small mammals, such as the lesser short-nosed fruit bat, greater musky fruit bat, Geoffroy's rousette, cave nectar bat, Asian house shrew, brown rat and Polynesian rat.

References

Parks in Quezon City
Botanical gardens in the Philippines
University of the Philippines Diliman
Tourist attractions in Quezon City
1948 establishments in the Philippines